BWI Airport station is a Baltimore Light Rail station at the Baltimore-Washington International Airport in Maryland. It is one of the two southern terminals of the Baltimore Light Rail. The station platforms are just outside an entrance to the International Concourse on the lower level.

The station opened in 1997, with trains then serving the station every 34 minutes and operating to Penn Station.

The station and the airport are served by Maryland Transit Administration's bus routes 17, 99, and 201; 24 hours a day, 7 days a week. Other local transit agencies also have buses serving the airport, including Howard Transit's Silver Route.

Station layout

Incidents
In 2000, there were two accidents in which light rail trains failed to stop at the station, ran into the end bumpers, and telescoped into the station's roof. In one case, the operator was under the influence of cocaine and oxycodone; he was fired four days after the accident and charged with reckless endangerment. In the other case, the operator was under the influence of prescription medication that made him drowsy.

As a result, a trip-stop was installed prior to the station. Operators of trains approaching the station must stop, reach out of the vehicle, and clear the trip-stop before proceeding at  into the station. A proper medical policy was also instituted at the insistence of the Federal Transit Administration.

References

External links
 
 Schedules

Baltimore Light Rail stations
Airport railway stations in the United States
Railway stations in the United States opened in 1997
Station
1997 establishments in Maryland
Railway stations in Anne Arundel County, Maryland